Doing Hard Time is a 2004 drama crime film starring Boris Kodjoe, Michael K. Williams, Steven Bauer, David Banks, and Giancarlo Esposito. Michael (Boris Kodjoe) was a good man and a loving father, until one day, his seven-year-old son was caught in the crossfire of a drug deal gone bad. Michael's mourning becomes outrage when his child's killers get only a slap on the wrist for drug possession.

He launches a crusade of vengeance, getting arrested himself so that he can go behind bars and deal out his own brand of justice to the two shooters. But in a place where there are no rules, revenge will no longer be Michael's only concern.

Plot
When Michael Mitchell's (Boris Kodjoe) seven-year-old son, Chase, is accidentally shot during an aborted drug deal, no one knows for sure which of the two gunmen, Curtis "Durty Curt From Detroit" Craig (Michael K. Williams) or Raymond "Razor" Carver (Michael Kimbrew), pulled the trigger. Because both men refuse to testify against the other, a jury finds them guilty only of drug possession, meaning they could be back on the street in two years.

Having already lost Chase's mother to cancer, Michael can't live with the idea of his only child's murder going unpunished. As part of a methodical plan to exact his revenge, he commits a brutal crime to get himself sentenced to the same institution as Durty Curt and Razor. Meanwhile, Durty Curt is determined to settle the score with Razor, who has fallen in with prison kingpin Eddie Mathematic (Sticky Fingaz).

As a showdown approaches, a cast of players, from prison guard Capt. Pierce (Giancarlo Esposito) to gay bookie Clever (William L. Johnson) to fast-talking druggy (David Banks) to Michael's illiterate cellmate, Smalls (Marcello Thedford), take sides and place bets on the outcome.

Cast
 Boris Kodjoe as Michael Mitchell
 Michael K. Williams as Curtis "Durty Curt From Detroit" Craig
 Sticky Fingaz as Eddie Mathematic
 David Banks as Chris
 Reagan Gomez-Preston as Rayvon Jones
 William L. Johnson as Clever
 Marcello Thedford as Toure Smalls
 Emilio Rivera as Officer David Teal
 Chenoa Maxwell as Elise
 Charles Malik Whitfield as Armand
 Patrice Fisher as Lt. Elaine Lodge
 Steven Bauer as Det. Anthony Wade
 Giancarlo Esposito as Captain Pierce
 Michael Kimbrew as Raymond "Razor" Carver
 Thomas Louis Wood as Detective #1

See also 
 List of hood films

External links 
 

2004 films
American prison films
Hood films
2004 drama films
American drama films
2000s American films